The men's triple jump event at the 2019 European Athletics Indoor Championships was held on 1 March at 20:25 (qualification) and 3 March at 19:35 (final) local time.

Medalists

Records

Results

Qualification
Qualification: Qualifying performance 16.70 (Q) or at least 8 best performers (q) advance to the Final

Final

References

2019 European Athletics Indoor Championships
Triple jump at the European Athletics Indoor Championships